Terence Gary McGee, usually called Terry McGee (born January 1936 in Cambridge, New Zealand) is an urban geographer and social scientist.

Key themes
McGees' major academic work has mainly been in the following areas:
 the geography of Southeast Asian cities
 the informal economy in developing countries;
 systems of food distribution in developing countries' cities;
 the emergence of extended metropolitan regions.
 rural-urban migration

Key publications
His major publications include:
 (1967) The Southeast Asian city: a social geography of the primate cities of Southeast Asia, London, Bell
 (1971) The Urbanization Process in the Third World, T. G. McGee. G. Bell and Sons, Ltd., London
 (1985) Theatres of Accumulation: Studies in Asian and Latin American Urbanization, together with Warwick Armstrong, London: Methuen

Academic career
McGee has been for many years the Director of the Institute of Asian Research at the University of British Columbia. He has also served as President of The Canadian Association of Geographers.

Awards
 (2000) Canadian Association of Geographers (CAG) Award for Scholarly Distinction in Geography
 (2009) Lauréat Prix International de Géographie Vautrin Lud

References

Other sources
 Institute of Asian Research
 Kelly, P.F. (editor) (2007): Essays in Honour of T.G. McGee. Asia Pacific Viewpoint.

1936 births
Living people
Canadian geographers
New Zealand geographers
Development specialists
Academic staff of the University of British Columbia
Recipients of the Vautrin Lud International Geography Prize
People from Cambridge, New Zealand
Urban geographers